Khalsi may refer to:
 Khalsi, Dehradun, a settlement in Uttarakhand, India
 Rock edicts of Khalsi, named after the settlement
 Khalsi, Leh, a settlement in Ladakh, India

See also 
 Mehdi Khalsi, Moroccan boxer
 Kalsi